David Michael Murray (born 23 December 1956) is an English guitarist, best known as a member of the heavy metal band Iron Maiden. He joined Iron Maiden early in its history, and is the second-longest serving member of the band after founder Steve Harris. Murray and Harris are the only members of Iron Maiden to have appeared on all of the band's releases.

Growing up in various areas of London, Murray became a member of a metalhead gang fighting skinheads before he took an interest in rock music at 15 and formed his first band Stone Free with Adrian Smith. After leaving school at 15, he regularly answered advertisements which appeared in Melody Maker before auditioning for Iron Maiden in 1976. In 1977 he was temporarily sacked from Iron Maiden and spent six months in Smith's band, Urchin. He rejoined Iron Maiden in 1978 and remains with the band to this day.

Biography
As a child, Murray's family lived in poverty and were constantly moving to different areas of London, which meant that he was often bullied and involved in fights. By the time his family settled in Clapton in 1970, Murray joined an early metalhead gang that brawled and won fights against East end skinheads and "had a rowdy couple of hairy hellraising years of being out on the street." He developed an interest in rock music when he was 15 after hearing "Voodoo Child" by Jimi Hendrix on the radio, about which he recalls, "everything changed, just like that. Getting into rock music wasn't like a gradual process for me; it was completely sort of extreme, totally black and white. I heard 'Voodoo Child' on the radio and I thought, 'Bloody hell! What is THAT? How do you do THAT?' And I started hanging around the rock music section of the record stores and buying albums, thinking about getting into the big time, wondering what that would be like."

After "hanging 'round record stores" and acquiring several Hendrix and blues albums, Murray decided to take up the guitar. At 16, he formed his first band, a trio called Stone Free, which also included his childhood friend Adrian Smith on vocals. From there, Murray would answer ads in Melody Maker and regularly audition for different bands at the weekend, leading to short stints in Electric Gas, "this sort of soft-rock, American-type band", and The Secret, "this sort of mad punk band", with whom he would record a single "The Young Ones" under the alias "Reggie Mental", and a demo, Café De Dance, in 1977.

He auditioned for Iron Maiden in late 1976, eager to get back into "a more sort of heavy rock-type vibe." At the time the band already had two guitarists, Dave Sullivan and Terry Rance, who disapproved of Murray being permitted to audition, seeing it as a slight on their ability. The group's founder and bassist Steve Harris did not hesitate to choose Murray over Sullivan and Rance, later stating: "When the others made it plain that it was either them or Dave Murray, there was no choice. There was no way I was gonna let Dave go. Not only was he a nice bloke, he was just the best guitarist I'd ever worked with. He still is." Unfortunately, after only a few months in the band, Murray was sacked following an argument with singer Dennis Wilcock after a show at the Bridge House pub in Canning Town.

Murray then reunited with Adrian Smith in Smith's band Urchin. During his short tenure with the band, Murray recorded one single, entitled "She's a Roller", after which he was asked to rejoin Iron Maiden shortly before Dennis Wilcock's departure. Murray managed to hold down a 9 to 5 job working as a storekeeper for the London Borough of Hackney, which he has stated was "so I could sleep off the night before", but was able to resign once Iron Maiden signed with EMI in 1979. Murray remains with Iron Maiden to the present day, and he and Harris are the only members who have appeared on all the band's commercial releases.

Playing technique and style 
Murray's solo guitar style throughout his career has been mainly based on the legato technique, such as on "The Trooper", which he claims "evolved naturally. I'd heard Jimi Hendrix using legato when I was growing up, and I liked that style of playing." His playing has a distinctly fluid sound which distinguishes him from the other two guitarists in Iron Maiden. He has also written songs for Iron Maiden, though he is less prolific than other band members, usually forgoing lyric writing and instead concentrating on the musical elements of songwriting. He mainly co-writes songs with another member of Iron Maiden, "Charlotte the Harlot" (from 1980's Iron Maiden) being to date the only composition for which he is credited as sole writer.

Along with Adrian Smith, Murray appears at no. 9 on Gibson's list of the "Top 10 Metal Guitarists of All Time". Murray played with the jazz ensemble on Iron Maiden drummer Nicko McBrain's instructional video Rhythms of the Beast.

Equipment
Murray used and endorsed Marshall amplifiers almost exclusively, other than on the Somewhere in Time (1986) and Seventh Son of a Seventh Son (1988) albums and their respective tours, when he instead used Gallien-Krueger amps, and Victory Amps during the recordings of The Book of Souls, but again Marshalls on tour (JVM410h).

Guitars
He has used Fender Stratocaster guitars almost exclusively. His black 1957/63 (the body is from a '63; the neck from a '57) Stratocaster, previously owned by late Free guitarist Paul Kossoff, was used approximately between 1978 and 1990. It was used as a template by Fender to manufacture an Artist Signature model in 2009. The original now resides at his mother's home. "I bought it in 1976," he said. "I saw it advertised in Melody Maker… I got the serial number to check it was [Kossoff's] guitar. It cost quite a bit of money but I didn't care. I just sold everything I had so I could get it, and I used it from then on. It just felt like I was holding a piece of magic because he had used this guitar."

In addition to Fender guitars, Murray has occasionally performed with various Dean, Gibson, Ibanez, ESP and Jackson electric models. During the Dance of Death World Tour 2003–4, Murray used a Gibson Hummingbird acoustic guitar for live performances of the song "Journeyman".

As of 2015, his main guitar is a 2-tone sunburst Fender Californian Series Stratocaster with two Seymour Duncan Hot Rails pick-ups (bridge and neck positions), one Seymour Duncan  JB Jr. pick-up (middle position) and a chrome Floyd Rose tremolo system. In 2015, Seymour Duncan announced the release of the official Dave Murray Loaded Pickguard set with demonstrator Danny Young performing the official video on the Seymour Duncan YouTube channel. On stage, Murray has also performed with a cream USA Floyd Rose Classic Stratocaster (with a 22-fret maple neck and same electronics and hardware as the sunburst model), a custom Stratocaster based on his aforementioned Paul Kossoff Fender, and a Gibson Flying V.

In 2010, he began using a Gibson Les Paul Traditional model, featuring Seymour Duncan '59 and JB pickups in the neck and bridge positions respectively, which his guitar technician, Colin Price, states was originally brought in for Adrian Smith to try, but was then bought by Murray for practising on tour. In addition to this Les Paul, he primarily used a 2002 Les Paul Classic with a Seymour Duncan '59 and JB neck and bridge pickups for the recording of The Book of Souls (2015), as well as a sunburst Gibson Les Paul Axccess with the same pickup configuration and a Floyd Rose tremolo.

In 2015, Fender announced a second Artist Signature model, based on his California Series Stratocaster. It retains all the specifications of his original guitar, has a compound radius fretboard and is made entirely in their Ensenada plant in Mexico.

Guitar specifications
 Ernie Ball Strings – custom gauge .009, .011, .014, .024, .032, .042
 Seymour Duncan Hot Rails single coil sized humbucking pick-ups with dual blade coils
 "Original" Floyd Rose Locking Tremolo Systems
 His Artist Signature model features a soft "V"-shaped maple neck with satin back and sports a humbucker/single-coil/humbucker (HSH) configuration – DiMarzio Super Distortion DP100 (bridge), American Vintage '57/'62 (middle), DiMarzio PAF DP-103 (neck) – with 3-way switching and American Vintage hardware. The Japanese-made "Tribute" version of the guitar (HST-57DM) features an "Original" Floyd Rose double-locking tremolo system, dual DiMarzio Super Distortion DP100 humbucking pick-ups (bridge/neck), a Fender Texas Special single-coil pick-up in the middle position, a 5-way pick-up selector and an oval neck profile
 The original black '57 Stratocaster has similar features to his Artist Series Model

Amplifiers
 2 x Marshall 1960B Straight Cabinet / 4x12 300-Watt Loaded with Celestion 12" G12T 75 Watt Speakers
 3 x Marshall JCM 2000 DSL tube heads (rack gear plugs into power amp section via FX loop)
 Marshall 9200 Rack Power Amp (as backup for main heads)
 Victory V100 head with Victory V412 Cabinet (as of 2014)
 Fender Super-Sonic 100-watt 2x12 combo

Units and tuners
 Korg DTR-1 Digital Tuner
 Dunlop DCR-1SR Rack Cry Baby Wah
 Dunlop JD-4S Rotovibe
 Custom-Built Pete Cornish Routing and Power Supply Units
 Marshall JMP-1 Valve Midi Preamp
 Mike Hill Custom Uni-Vibe/Tube Screamer Rack Effect Unit
 Rocktron All-Access Foot Controller
 TC Electronic GForce Effect Unit
 Fulltone Deja'Vibe
 Fulltone Clyde Standard Wah Pedal
 MXR Uni-Vibe Chorus
 MXR Distortion +
 TC Electronic Flashback Delay
 TC Electronic Corona Chorus
 Voodoo Amplification Platinum Mod to Marshall JMP-1 Preamp
 Wampler Clarksdale Delta Overdrive
 Phil Hilborne Fat Treble Booster

Personal life
In his spare time, Murray (along with bandmate Nicko McBrain) is an avid golfer, as seen in the Rock in Rio DVD and Iron Maiden: Flight 666; he revealed in 2002 that he tries to play "a couple of rounds in each week" and his handicap "can be anywhere from 15 to 24." Murray and his wife Tamar have one daughter named Tasha (born 1991). When not on tour, Murray resides on the island of Maui, Hawaii.

Discography

Iron Maiden

Iron Maiden (1980)
Killers (1981)
The Number of the Beast (1982)
Piece of Mind (1983)
Powerslave (1984)
Somewhere in Time (1986)
Seventh Son of a Seventh Son (1988)
No Prayer for the Dying (1990)
Fear of the Dark (1992)
The X Factor (1995)
Virtual XI (1998)
Brave New World (2000)
Dance of Death (2003)
A Matter of Life and Death (2006)
The Final Frontier (2010)
The Book of Souls (2015)
Senjutsu (2021)

Guest appearances
Hear 'n Aid – "Stars" (1985)
Nicko McBrain – Rhythms of the Beast (video, 1991)
Psycho Motel – "With You Again", Welcome to the World (1997)

References

Literature

External links

 
 

1956 births
Living people
20th-century British guitarists
21st-century British guitarists
English heavy metal guitarists
Iron Maiden members
People from Edmonton, London
English people of Scottish descent
English rock guitarists
Lead guitarists
Musicians from London